The procedural officers and senior officials of the Parliament of Canada are responsible for the administration of the Senate and the House of Commons:

Senate
 Clerk of the Senate and Clerk of the Parliaments
 Deputy Clerk of the Senate of Canada
 Law Clerk and Parliamentary Counsel of the Senate of Canada
 Usher of the Black Rod of the Senate of Canada
 Senate Ethics Officer

House of Commons
 Clerk of the House of Commons
 Deputy Clerk of the House of Commons
 Clerk Assistant
 Law Clerk and Parliamentary Counsel   
 Sergeant-at-Arms

Library of Parliament
The Parliamentary Librarian is an officer of the parliament of Canada and in charge of the library on Parliament Hill.

See also
 Great Officer of State

References
 Officers and Officials of Parliament

Ceremonial officers in Canada